Monstera boliviana is a flowering plant belonging to genus Monstera of family Araceae.

Distribution 
It is native to Bolivia and Peru.

References 

boliviana